Rupesh Puna (born 19 April 1981) is a retired professional footballer who represented New Zealand at international level.

Playing career
Puna has played for Caversham AFC, Otago United and currently plays for Waitakere United in the New Zealand Football Championship.

Puna made his full All Whites debut in a 0–3 loss to Iran on 12 October 2003 and ended his international playing career with 2 A-international caps to his credit, his final cap an appearance in a 2–4 loss to Vanuatu on 2 June 2004.

References

External links

1981 births
Living people
New Zealand association footballers
New Zealand international footballers
2004 OFC Nations Cup players
New Zealand sportspeople of Indian descent

Association football defenders
Caversham AFC players